John Henry Gerstner (November 22, 1914 – March 24, 1996) was an American Reformed and Presbyterian theologian and professor of Church History at Pittsburgh Theological Seminary and Knox Theological Seminary. He was an expert on the life and theology of Jonathan Edwards.

Career
Gerstner earned both a Master of Divinity degree and a Master of Theology degree from Westminster Theological Seminary. He earned his Doctor of Philosophy degree in Church History from Harvard University in 1945. He was originally ordained in the United Presbyterian Church of North America, then (due to church unions) with the United Presbyterian Church in the United States of America and the Presbyterian Church (USA). In 1990, he left the PCUSA for the Presbyterian Church in America.

Gerstner counted among his students noted author and preacher R. C. Sproul, founder of Ligonier Ministries; Dr. Arthur Lindsley, Senior Fellow at the C.S. Lewis Institute, Dr. Walter (Wynn) Kenyon, Professor of Biblical Studies and Philosophy, Chair of the Philosophy Department and Division of Ministry and Human Services at Belhaven University; Rev. Robert Ingram, founding board member and Headmaster of The Geneva School; and Dr. Mark Ross, the John R. de Witt Professor of Systematic Theology and Director of the Institute for Reformed Worship at Erskine Theological Seminary.

In addition to his books, Gerstner recorded several lengthy audio courses giving a survey of theology, church history, and Christian apologetics, which are distributed through Ligonier Ministries. Gerstner was non-dispensationalist.

In 1976, a Festschrift was published in Gerstner's honor. Soli Deo Gloria: Essays in Reformed Theology included contributions by Cornelius Van Til, J. I. Packer, Philip Edgecumbe Hughes, John Murray, R. C. Sproul, John Warwick Montgomery, and Roger Nicole.

Works

Books

Chapters

Festschrift

References

External links
 
 John Gerstner sermons/lectures at Aisquith Presbyterian Church https://aisquith.org/sermon-speaker/john-h-gerstner/

1914 births
1996 deaths
People from Tampa, Florida
Presbyterians from Florida
Presbyterian Church in America ministers
American Calvinist and Reformed theologians
Reformation historians
20th-century Calvinist and Reformed theologians
20th-century American historians
20th-century American clergy
Harvard University alumni
Westminster Theological Seminary alumni
Pittsburgh Theological Seminary faculty
Knox Theological Seminary faculty